MELLSCOPE is the first studio album from the I've Sound singer, Mell, released on August 20, 2008. The album contains four new songs, two old songs from an eroge, two remixed old songs (including a remix of her first song with I've Sound), and four songs from her first three released singles, namely "Red fraction", "Proof/no vain", and "Virgin's high!/kicks!".

The album comes in a limited or CD+DVD edition (GNCV-1005) and a regular or CD-only edition (GNCV-1006). The DVD will contain the PV for "SCOPE" and alternative PVs for "no vain" and "kicks!". The DVD also contains a documentary of MELL's time in France, and documents both the photo shoot for MELLSCOPE as well as her work with Deep Forest. Lastly, Deep Forest's Eric Mouquet is interviewed in full English, including Japanese subtitles.

Track listing (CD)
SCOPE - 4:21
Composition/Arrangement: Kazuya Takase
Lyrics: MELL
Red fraction - 3:41
Composition/Arrangement: Kazuya Takase
Lyrics: MELL
Way beyond there - 5:04
Composition: Tomoyuki Nakazawa
Arrangement: Tomoyuki Nakazawa, Takeshi Ozaki
Lyrics: MELL
repeat - 6:38
Composition/Arrangement/Lyrics: Kazuya Takase
Virgin's high! - 4:21
Composition/Arrangement: Maiko Iuchi
Lyrics: MELL
no vain - 5:59
Composition/Arrangement: Kazuya Takase
Lyrics: MELL
Permit - 4:09
Composition: Tomoyuki Nakazawa
Arrangement: Tomoyuki Nakazawa, Takeshi Ozaki
Lyrics: MELL (English Translation: Harry Yoshida)
Under Superstition - 4:59
Composition/Arrangement: Maiko Iuchi
Lyrics: MELL
kicks! - 3:49
Composition/Arrangement: Kazuya Takase
Lyrics: MELL
The first finale in me - 5:09
Composition/Arrangement: Tomoyuki Nakazawa
Lyrics: MELL
 - 5:13
Composition/Lyrics: Kazuya Takase
Arrangement: Kazuya Takase, Tomoyuki Nakazawa
repeat -Deep Forest remix- - 4:49
Composition/Lyrics: Kazuya Takase
Arrangement: Eric Mouquet (Deep Forest)

Track listing (DVD)
SCOPE (PV)
no vain -another side-
kicks! -another side-
Documentary of MELL's time in France
Interview with Eric Mouquet of Deep Forest

2008 albums
Mell albums